Sassafras is a locality in the City of Shoalhaven in New South Wales, Australia. It lies on the Braidwood Road (which was originally built as the Wool Road), where it passes over the coastal escarpment on the road between Nowra and Nerriga. This road continues southwest to Braidwood, but this involves a section of unsealed road. The sealed Oallen Ford Road branches off south of Nerriga, which connects via various sealed roads to Canberra and Goulburn. Sassafras is a small community of orchards in an area of extensive national parks.

References

Further reading

City of Shoalhaven
Localities in New South Wales